Antirrhinin is an anthocyanin. It is the 3-rutinoside of cyanidin.

Occurrence 
It can be found in Antirrhinum majus (common snapdragon).

It can be found in blackcurrant, açaí, black raspberry, litchi pericarp and common fig.

Metabolism 
Cyanidin 3-O-rutinoside 5-O-glucosyltransferase uses UDP-glucose and cyanidin 3-O-rutinoside (antirrhinin) to produce UDP and cyanidin 3-O-rutinoside 5-O-beta-D-glucoside.

References 

Anthocyanin rutinosides